Philip 'Phil' Nigel Unsworth (born 7 July 1963) is a former English cricketer. Unsworth was a right-handed batsman who bowled both slow left-arm orthodox and left-arm medium pace. He was born in Wigan, Lancashire.

Unsworth represented the Lancashire Cricket Board in a single List A match against the Yorkshire Cricket Board in the 2001 Cheltenham & Gloucester Trophy. In his only List A match, he scored 6 runs and took a single catch in the field. With the ball he took a single wickets at a cost of 34 runs.

References

External links
Philip Unsworth at Cricinfo
Philip Unsworth at CricketArchive

1963 births
Living people
Cricketers from Wigan
English cricketers
Lancashire Cricket Board cricketers